Avé-Lallemant or Avé Lallemant is a surname. People with the name include:

 Hans Avé Lallemant (1938–2016), Dutch born-American geologist
 Julius Léopold Eduard Avé-Lallemant (1803–1867), German botanist
 Robert Christian Avé-Lallemant (1812–1884), German physician and explorer
 Theodor Avé-Lallemant (1806–1890), German musician and music teacher

Compound surnames